The Jelcz M125M (to 2001 called "Dana", after "Vecto") – 12-meters long, first rigid (non-articulated) full-size low-floor bus designed by Zakłady Samochodowe Jelcz S.A. in Jelcz-Laskowice (and the first Polish 100% LF bus). Produced from 1998 to 2006, it was supplied by Jelcz until their collapse in 2008. It is a competitor to the other full-size low-floor buses from other European countries.

The M125M Vecto model was created from scratch and was not directly structurally based on the previous vehicles from Jelcz. Compared to buses previously produced by Zakłady Samochodowe, Jelcz differed primarily in the drive unit, which was the MAN D0826 engine with 220 HP.

See also
 Jelcz M11 (step entrance full-size)
 Jelcz PR110 (step entrance full-size)
 Jelcz PR110D (low floor coach)

References

M125M
Full-size buses
Low-floor buses
Rear-wheel-drive vehicles

Vehicles introduced in 1998